The Overskate Stakes is a Canadian Thoroughbred horse race run annually during the latter part of October at Woodbine Racetrack in Toronto, Ontario. An Ontario Sire Stakes, it is a restricted race for horses age three and older. It is currently contested over a distance of  furlongs on Woodbine's inner turf course with a purse of C$100,000.

Inaugurated in 1997, it is named in honor of Overskate,  a Canadian Horse Racing Hall of Fame horse who holds the record for most Sovereign Award with nine.

Prior to 2020, the race was run on the main track at a distance of 7 furlongs.

Records
Speed  record:
1:20.54 - Verne's Baby (2006) - 7 furlongs on dirt

Most wins:
 2 - Krz Ruckus (2001, 2002)

Most wins by a jockey:
 3 - Eurico Rosa Da Silva (2014, 2016, 2017)
 2 - Justin Stein (2011, 2012, 2013

Most wins by a trainer:
 3 - Robert Tiller (2007, 2015, 2017)

Most wins by an owner:
 2 - Buttigieg Training Centre (2011, 2013, 2018)
 2 - Ron Guidolin et al. (2001, 2002)
 2 - Bruno Schickendanz (2009, 2016)

Winners of the Overskate Stakes

References

Ungraded stakes races in Canada
Recurring sporting events established in 1997
Woodbine Racetrack